Poynton with Worth Town Council is the town council for the Cheshire Market Town of Poynton. Formerly known as Poynton with Worth Parish Council, the Council resolved in 2009 to become a Town Council.

On 10 January 2020, the town council was recognized by the NHS Cheshire Clinical Commissioning Group (CCG)  and awarded NHS Bronze Self Care Award at a celebration ceremony held at Poynton Civic Hall. The award is part of a programme promoting the benefits of self care throughout local communities.

References

Town Councils in Cheshire
Local precepting authorities in England
Town Council